Prior to its uniform adoption of proportional representation in 1999, the United Kingdom used first-past-the-post for the European elections in England, Scotland and Wales. The European Parliament constituencies used under that system were smaller than the later regional constituencies and only had one Member of the European Parliament each.

Created for the 1979 European Parliament elections in 1979, Highlands and Islands was a single-member constituency formed from the grouping of numerous neighbouring Scottish constituencies of the UK Parliament.

Boundaries
1979–1984: Argyll; Banff; Caithness and Sutherland; Inverness; Moray and Nairn; Orkney and Shetland; Ross and Cromarty; Western Isles

1984–1999: Argyll and Bute; Caithness and Sutherland; Inverness, Nairn and Lochaber; Moray; Orkney and Shetland; Ross, Cromarty and Skye; Western Isles

Members of the European Parliament

Election results

References

External links
 David Boothroyd's United Kingdom Election Results 

Politics of Highland (council area)
European Parliament constituencies in Scotland (1979–1999)
1979 establishments in Scotland
1999 disestablishments in Scotland
Constituencies established in 1979
Constituencies disestablished in 1999